Below is the list of the 124th Maine Senate, which was sworn into office on December 3, 2008 and left office in December 2010.

On December 3, Libby Mitchell (D-Kennebec) was the only candidate nominated for President of the Maine Senate and was subsequently elected Senate President.

The 124th Senate consisted of 21 Democrats and 14 Republicans. In April 2009, the Maine Senate approved LD 1020 with a 21-14 vote. The bill if enacted allowed same-sex couples to marry. The bill ultimately passed the Maine Legislature as a whole and was signed by Governor John Baldacci before being repealed via a people's veto in November 2009.

State Senators
1 Peter Bowman (D) of Kittery, York County
2 Richard Nass (R) of Acton, York County
3 Jonathan Courtney (R) of Sanford, York County
4 Nancy Sullivan (D) of Biddeford, York County
5 Barry Hobbins (D) of Saco, York County
6 Phil Bartlett (D) of Gorham, Cumberland County
7 Larry Bliss (D) of South Portland, Cumberland County
8 Justin Alfond (D) of Portland, Cumberland County
9 Joseph Brannigan (D) of Portland, Cumberland County
10 Stan Gerzofsky (D) of Brunswick, Cumberland County
11 Gerald Davis (R) of Falmouth, Cumberland County
12 G. William Diamond (D) of Windham, Cumberland County
13 David Hastings (D) of Fryeburg, Oxford County
14 Bruce Bryant (D) of Dixfield, Oxford County
15 Deborah Simpson (D) of Auburn, Androscoggin County
16 Margaret Craven (D) of Lewiston, Androscoggin County
17 John Nutting (D) of Leeds, Androscoggin County
18 Walter Gooley (R) of Farmington, Franklin County
19 Seth Goodall (D) Richmond, Sagadahoc County
20 David Trahan (R) of Waldoboro, Lincoln County
21 Earle McCormick (R) of West Gardiner, Kennebec County
22 Chris Rector(R) of Thomaston, Knox County
23 Carol Weston (R) of Montville, Waldo County
24 Libby Mitchell (D) of Vassalboro, Kennebec County
25 Lisa Marrache (D) of Waterville, Kennebec County
26 S. Peter Mills (R) of Cornville, Somerset County
27 Douglas Smith (R), Dover-Foxcroft, Piscataquis County
28 Dennis Damon (D) of Trenton, Hancock County
29 Kevin Raye (R) of Perry, Washington County
30 Elizabeth Schneider (D) of Orono, Penobscot County
31 Richard Rosen (R) of Bucksport, Penobscot County
32 Joseph Perry (D) of Bangor, Penobscot County
33 Debra Plowman (R) of Hampden, Penobscot County
34 Roger Sherman (R) of Hodgdon, Aroostook County
35 Troy Dale Jackson (D) of Allagash, Aroostook County

References

Maine legislative sessions
2000s in Maine
2008 in Maine
2009 in Maine
2010 in Maine